Ljubav i drugi zločini, or  Love and Other Crimes in English, is a 2008 Serbian romantic comedy directed by Stefan Arsenijević, and written by Arsenijević and Srđan Koljević, and stars Anica Dobra and Vuk Kostić. The film won Arsenijević an award for Best Director at the 2008 Sofia International Film Festival.

Cast 
 Anica Dobra – Anica
 Vuk Kostić – Stanislav
 Milena Dravić – Majka
 Feđa Stojanović – Milutin
 Hanna Schwamborn – Ivana
 Ljubomir Bandović – Nikola
 Ana Marković – Devojka u solarijumu
 Dušica Žegarac – Bozana
 Semka Sokolović-Bertok – Anicina baka
 Josif Tatić – Radovan
 Anita Mančić – Nikolija
 Zoran Cvijanović – Zoran

External links 
 

2008 films
2008 romantic comedy-drama films
Serbian comedy-drama films
Films set in Serbia
Films set in Belgrade
Serbian romance films
2008 comedy films
2008 drama films
Films shot in Serbia
Films shot in Belgrade